The Marijuana Party fielded a number of candidates in the 2004 federal election, none of whom were elected.  Information about these candidates may be found here.

Quebec

Beauport: Nicolas Frichot
Nicolas Frichot was born in 1967 in Geneva, Switzerland, and later relocated to the Quebec City area of Canada. A photographer, filmmaker, and visual artist by trade, he has served on the boards of Mainfilm and l’association lafriche. In 2009, he was a student at Université Laval.

Elected as a school commissioner in 2007, Frichot has also sought election to public office at the federal, provincial, and municipal levels. He called for the closure of Quebec City's incinerator in 2009, describing it as a major source of pollution in the city.

Richelieu: Daniel Blackburn

Daniel Blackburn has been a candidate for public office at the federal, provincial and municipal levels, sometimes using the names Black D Blackburn or Blak D Blackburn.  He identified himself as a television producer in 2004.  While running for municipal office in 2005, he blamed prohibition and Sûreté du Québec tactics for creating a culture of violence within the local cannabis economy.

Saint-Laurent—Cartierville: Alex Néron
Alexandre (Alex) Néron has a certificate in screenwriting from the University of Quebec at Montreal and has worked an independent videographer in Montreal. A founding member of the Marijuana Party, he has run in three federal and two provincial elections.

Ontario

Lanark—Frontenac—Lennox and Addington: George Walter Kolaczynski

Kolaczynski received 479 votes (0.85%), finishing sixth against the winner of the riding Conservative candidate Scott Reid.

Manitoba

Charleswood—St. James: Dan Zupansky

Zupansky has described himself as a business owner and salesperson.  He was the host of a news-radio program on UMFM at the time of the election, and still holds this position .  He received 337 votes (0.80%), finishing fifth against the winner of the riding Conservative candidate Steven Fletcher.

Elmwood—Transcona: Gavin Whittaker

Whittaker has been a candidate of both the Marijuana Party of Canada and the Libertarian Party of Manitoba. He organized public screenings of the Rocky Horror Picture Show in Winnipeg during the 1990s and took part in a pro-marijuana rally outside the Legislative Assembly of Manitoba in 1999. In 2004, he listed his occupation as "sales representative" in 2004. His partner, Rebecca Whittaker, has also been a Marijuana Party candidate.

Kildonan—St. Paul: Rebecca Whittaker

Rebecca Whittaker (born in Kenora, Ontario) listed herself as an administrative assistant in 2004. She received 290 votes (0.80%), finishing fifth against Conservative candidate Joy Smith. Her partner, Gavin Whittaker, has also been a Marijuana Party candidate.

References

2004
Candidates in the 2004 Canadian federal election